The Perth Thundersticks are an Australian hockey club based in Perth, Western Australia. The club was established in 2019, and is one of 7 established to compete in Hockey Australia's new premier domestic competition, Hockey One.

The club is intended to unify men's and women's by combining teams under one name, unlike Western Australia's former representation in the Australian Hockey League as the WA Thundersticks (men) and WA Diamonds (women).

Perth Thundersticks will compete for the first time in the inaugural season of Hockey One, which will be contested from late September through to mid November 2019.

History
Perth Thundersticks, along with six other teams, was founded on 17 April 2019 as part of Hockey Australia's development of hockey.

While this club was established in April 2019, the Perth Thundersticks have competed at a national level in the past. Before transitioning to their current name, the WA Thundersticks, the team previously competed under the name Perth Thundersticks until 2001.

Uniform
The club colours are WA's traditional colours, black, gold and white.

Home stadium 
Perth Thundersticks are based out of the Perth Hockey Stadium in Western Australia's capital city, Perth. The stadium has a capacity of 6,000 spectators.

Throughout the Hockey One league, Perth Thundersticks will play a number of home games at the stadium.

Teams

Men's team
Details and team rosters to be confirmed.

Women's team
Details and team rosters to be confirmed.

References

External links
 https://web.archive.org/web/20070307114712/http://www.hockeywa.org.au/thunderstruck/thundersticks.cfm

Australian field hockey clubs
Sporting clubs in Perth, Western Australia
Representative sports teams of Western Australia
Field hockey in Western Australia
Field hockey clubs established in 1991
1991 establishments in Australia